The 1991 European Youth Olympic Days (1991 EYOD) was the inaugural edition of multi-sport event for European youths between the ages of 13 and 18. It was held in Brussels, Belgium from 12 to 21 July. A total of nine sports were contested by 2084 athletes representing 33 European nations. The idea for the competition came from Jacques Rogge, an International Olympic Committee member, as the continent did not have its own multi-sport event at the time.

Sports

Nine sports were included in these initial Games, five individual sports of athletics, swimming, judo, tennis and table tennis for both genders, and four team sports; football and basketball for boys, volleyball and field hockey for girls.

Medal table

References

Medal table
Tableau des médailles Bruxelles - Belgique (1991). French Olympic Committee. Retrieved on 2014-11-23.

 
1991
European Youth Olympic Days
European Youth Olympic Days
European Youth Olympic Days
Multi-sport events in Belgium
Sports competitions in Brussels
Youth sport in Belgium
1990s in Brussels
July 1991 sports events in Europe
International sports competitions hosted by Belgium